Don Gavin is an American stand-up comedian and actor best known for such films and television series as Shallow Hal and Dr. Katz, Professional Therapist.

References

External links 

American male comedians
21st-century American comedians
American stand-up comedians
American male film actors
American male voice actors
American male television actors
Living people
Year of birth missing (living people)